The Council Rock School District, also known as CRSD,  is located in lower Bucks County, in southeastern Pennsylvania. The District's administrative offices are located in one of the original school district buildings in the Borough of Newtown.  The building, The Chancellor Center, (formerly known as The Chancellor Street school) dates back to 1871 and was remodeled in 2003. As of June 2022, the district's total enrollment is 10,543.  It spends over US$12,000 per secondary student per year (not including special education students). According to the district's website, the final budget for the 2021–2022 school year allocated over $250M to the district. The district operates two high schools (grades 9-12), two middle schools (grades 7-8), ten elementary schools (grades K-6), and an alternative school called The STAR Center which houses The Sloan School, The Twilight School, and The A.C.H.I.E.V.E. Program.

Borough of Newtown
Newtown Township
Northampton Township
Upper Makefield Township
Wrightstown Township

The district's current Superintendent of Schools is Dr. Andrew J. Sanko, Ed.d

Overview 

As of the 2020 United States Census, the total population of the school district is 74,221.  As of June 2022, the school district educates 10,543 students, K-12, and has approximately 956 teachers and supervisors, as well as clerical, custodial, maintenance, and cafeteria employees who support the instructional program. The school district is the 11th largest employer in the area. 
The school district operates sixteen schools in total: ten elementary schools (grades K-6), two middle schools (grades 7-8), two high schools (grades 9-12), and one alternative high school. Council Rock is also one of four school districts participating with the Middle Bucks Institute of Technology located in Jamison, Pennsylvania.

Council Rock had only one high school until the 2002-2003 academic year when they added a second high school (CR-North and CR-South) to alleviate overcrowding at Council Rock High School North.  Before 1969, the high school was located in the building used for the Newtown Middle School. Prior to that, the high school was located in a smaller building on Chancellor Street in Newtown; a building that later became Chancellor Street Elementary school before closing in 2002.  The Chancellor Street school was extensively renovated and reopened as The Chancellor Center to the delight of townspeople and alumni.

Schools

High Schools
 Council Rock High School North
 Council Rock High School South
The Sloan School

Middle schools
 Newtown Middle School
 Holland Middle School

Elementary schools
 Goodnoe Elementary School, Newtown, Pennsylvania
 Sol Feinstone Elementary School, Newtown, Pennsylvania
 Newtown Elementary School, Newtown, Pennsylvania
 Churchville Elementary School, Churchville, Pennsylvania
 Hillcrest Elementary School, Holland, Pennsylvania
 Holland Elementary School, Holland, Pennsylvania
 Maureen M. Welch Elementary School, Churchville, Pennsylvania
 Richboro Elementary School, Richboro, Pennsylvania
 Rolling Hills Elementary School, Holland, Pennsylvania
 Wrightstown Elementary School, Wrightstown, Pennsylvania

Teacher strike
In mid-2000, reports revealed that teachers in the were considering the possibility of going on strike.  At the time, Council Rock's teachers were the highest paid in the state, with a median salary of $85,395 per year, not including benefits.  Despite the high salaries, the School District averted a strike by offering the Council Rock teachers union (CREA) a contract that included a pay raise for 62% of teachers and dropped a proposal for merit pay. The strike was resolved at 4:30 am on September 6, 2002, after an 11-hour negotiation session.

References

External links

School districts in Bucks County, Pennsylvania